Linda Mary MacWhinney (1 July 1888 – 5 June 1951) was an Irish nurse and Fianna Fáil politician.

Early life
Born in Cloonagh, Dromard, County Sligo, she was one of eight children born to Thomas and Catherine "Nora" (née Clarke) Kearns. From 1907, she studied and trained to be a nurse. She had not been interested in nationalism or republicanism prior to the Easter Rising and had intended to serve as a nurse in France during World War I until a chance meeting with Thomas MacDonagh changed her mind and radicalised her.

Easter Rising
Two days after the insurgents seized the Dublin GPO during the Easter Rising in April 1916, Kearns, a nurse, took over an empty building on North Great George's Street. She hung a Red Cross flag above the door and welcomed casualties of the fighting, from both sides of the conflict. However, as she had treated republican volunteers during the uprising, the British Army ordered Kearns to close her unofficial hospital. She did so, with great reluctance.

After the Rising

She realised she had skills that could be useful in times of war. After the Rising she went into private nursing. She was the nurse to the O'Connor Morris family in Tullamore and traveled extensively with them. After Maurice O'Connor Morris's death on 11 February 1916, he left Linda an inheritance of £2,500. She was able to purchase a car, which would later come in useful during the Irish War of Independence when she worked as a courier for Michael Collins transporting information and sometimes arms. Her status as a nurse helped her evade detection until she was caught in November 1920 in Sligo transporting firearms. The county inspector reported her arrest as follows:

In a statement to the Bureau of Military History in 1950, Kearns alleged she was badly beaten during her arrest by a Black and Tan Officer, so much so she suffered permanent damage to her teeth. She was sentenced to 10 years imprisonment. She served time in a number of Irish prisons before being sent to Walton Prison in Liverpool, where she went on hunger strike.

From there she was sent to Mountjoy Prison. In October 1921, she famously escaped from Mountjoy Jail with three other women, Mae Burke, Eileen Keogh, and Eithne Coyle. The escape had been personally arranged by Michael Collins, and it made international headlines, featuring in the New York Times on 31 October 1921 under the heading "Four Women Break Jail".

Following their escape, Kearns and her fellow escapees split up and were taken to individual safe houses. However, they were each visited by a man calling himself Seamus Burke, who had previously visited them in Mountjoy claiming to be an IRA man, and were told they needed to be regrouped. The four were not long back together when they were notified in a message from Michael Collins that Seamus Burke was, in fact, a British spy who was trying to regroup them so that they could all be re-arrested together. They were ordered to immediately move to an IRA training camp in Duckett's Grove, County Carlow. The four women remained there until the signing of the Anglo-Irish Treaty.

Her memoir, In Times of Peril, leaves from the Diary of Nurse Linda Kearns from Easter Week 1916 to Mountjoy 1921 was edited by Annie M.P. Smithson in 1922.

In 1924–25, she conducted a successful fundraising tour of Australia on behalf of Republican causes.

Linda Kearns was one of five women elected to the executive of Fianna Fail when it was formed in 1926.

She was elected to Seanad Éireann on the Industrial and Commercial Panel in April 1938. She was defeated at the Seanad election of August 1938.

Personal life
She married Wilson Charles MacWhinney in 1929. MacWhinney was formerly a Commanding Officer in Derry Brigade IRA during the war of Independence before moving to Dublin in 1924. Together they had one daughter, Ann, in 1930.

See also
List of members of the Oireachtas imprisoned during the Irish revolutionary period

References

External links
In times of peril: leaves from the diary of Nurse Linda Kearns from Easter week, 1916, to Mountjoy, 1921, edited by Annie M.P. Smithson, held at Villanova University's Falvey Memorial Library.

1888 births
1951 deaths
Fianna Fáil senators
Irish nurses
Members of the 2nd Seanad
20th-century women members of Seanad Éireann
People from County Sligo
Politicians from County Dublin
Women in war in Ireland